Vikram Singh may refer to:

 Vikram Singh (actor) (born 1979), Indian film actor
 Vikram Singh (air marshal) (born 1963), Indian Air Force
 Vikram Singh (author) (born 1976), Indian author
 Vikram Singh (composer) (born 1983), Indian singer, composer, director and producer
 Vikram Singh (police officer) (born 1950), Indian educationist and Indian Police Service officer
 Vikram Singh (politician), Indian politician
 Vikram Singh (producer), Indian film producer
 V. R. V. Singh (born 1984), Indian cricketer
 Vikramjit Singh (born 2003), Dutch cricketer
 Vikram Pratap Singh (born 2002), Indian footballer